Palmer Pond is located southeast of Riparius, New York. Fish species present in the lake are tiger trout, brook trout, rainbow trout, and brown trout. There is a trail off Palmer Road on the south shore.

References

Lakes of New York (state)
Lakes of Warren County, New York